Dayu may refer to:

Dayu, Banmauk, Sagaing Region, Burma
Yu (Stargate), a Goa'uld System Lord in the TV show Stargate SG-1
Softstar (大宇資訊), a Chinese language video game developer and publisher.

China
Yu the Great (大禹), legendary monarch of the Xia Dynasty
Dayu County (大余县), in Ganzhou, Jiangxi
Dayu, Handan (大峪镇), a town in Fengfeng Mining District, Handan, Hebei
Dayu, Jianghua Yao County (大圩镇), a town in Jianghua Yao Autonomous County, Hunan
Dayu, Rudong County (大豫镇), a town in Rudong County, Jiangsu
Dayu, Yangqu County (大盂镇), a town in Yangqu County, Shanxi

Iran
Dayu, Ardabil, a village in Ardabil Province, Iran
Dayu, Bushehr, a village in Bushehr Province, Iran